Bidwill is a locality in the Fraser Coast Region, Queensland, Australia.

Geography
The Mary River forms the short north-western boundary, while Jumpo Creek forms the western boundary on its way to join the Mary.

References 

Fraser Coast Region
Localities in Queensland